Deborah Hopkinson is an American writer of children's books, primarily historical fiction, nonfiction and picture books. She was born in Lowell, Massachusetts.

Selected books
Sweet Clara and the Freedom Quilt (1993)
Maria's Comet (1999)
Pioneer Summer (2002)
Girl Wonder: A Baseball Story in Nine Innings (2003)
Shutting Out the Sky (2003)
Apples to Oregon (2004)
Sky Boys (2005)
Into the Firestorm (2006)
Abe Lincoln Crosses a Creek (2008) 
Keep On! The Story of Matthew Henson, Co-Discoverer of the North Pole (2009)
Titanic: Voices from the Disaster (2012)
The Great Trouble: A Mystery of London, the Blue Death, and a Boy Called Eel (2013)
Steamboat School (2016)
A Letter to my Teacher (2017)

Awards
Sweet Clara and the Freedom Quilt won the International Reading Association Award. 
Sky Boys, about the builders of the Empire State Building, was a Boston Globe–Horn Book Award Honor book.
Keep On!, about Matthew Henson, won the Eloise Jarvis McGraw Award for Children's Literature for 2009/2010.
Titanic: Voices from the Disaster was a Robert F. Sibert Honor book and a YALSA Excellence in Nonfiction finalist. 
The Great Trouble, a novel about Dr. John Snow and a cholera outbreak in Victorian London, was an Oregon Book Award finalist and winner of the Oregon Spirit Award. 
Steamboat School, about John Berry Meachum and his students, received the 2017 Jane Addams Children's Book Award, given annually to a children's book that advances the causes of peace and social equality.  
Two of her books won a Jane Addams Book Honor Award in 2004: Girl Wonder: A Baseball Story in Nine Innings about Alta Weiss, for younger readers and Shutting Out the Sky, about immigrants in 1900s New York, for older readers.
Shutting Out the Sky was also an NCTE Orbis Pictus Honor Book.
She received Mathical Honors for The Great Trouble: A Mystery of London, the Blue Death, and a Boy Called Eel.
Follow the Moon Home won the Green Book Award for children's picture book in 2017, and in 2021 she received the award again for her book Butterflies Belong Here.

See also

References

External links
 
 
 Deborah Hopkinson at Fantastic Fiction

Living people
American children's writers
American historical novelists
Writers from Lowell, Massachusetts
American women children's writers
1942 births
21st-century American women